The Riker–Lent–Smith Homestead and Cemetery are a historic house and cemetery in East Elmhurst, New York. The neighborhood, within the New York City borough of Queens, is called Steinway in the National Register of Historic Places designation document.

The earliest part of the house was built by Abraham Riker in 1656. He was an early settler of New Amsterdam, and a member of the Riker family, for whom Rikers Island nearby is named; the house was owned by the Riker and Lent families for much of its history. In 1729, the house was expanded and additions were built by then-owner Abraham Lent, a descendant of Abraham Riker. The small graveyard contains not only the graves of family members, but also that of Irish revolutionary and physician William James MacNeven who died in 1841 and who had stayed with the Riker family. Around 1800 the house was again expanded to its current size. It remains an intact house in the Dutch Colonial style. Current owner Marion Duckworth Smith and her late husband Michael Smith began restoration work in 1980, and the house was added to the National Register of Historic Places in 1984.

The house is the oldest known existing residential structure in the borough of Queens, New York.

See also
 Oldest buildings in the United States of America.

References

External links
 

Cemeteries on the National Register of Historic Places in New York City
Houses on the National Register of Historic Places in Queens, New York
Houses completed in 1729
Cemeteries in Queens, New York
1729 establishments in the Thirteen Colonies
East Elmhurst, Queens